Captain Frederick Secker Bell CB (17 August 1897 – 23 November 1973) of the Royal Navy was the commander of  during the Battle of the River Plate in December 1939.

He was educated at Matfield Grange, a prep school in Kent, and then at the Royal Naval Colleges of Osborne and Dartmouth.

In this battle, Exeter also incurred severe damage from seven hits by eleven-inch shells and suffered 61 killed and 23 wounded. One salvo from the Graf Spee did a great deal of damage to the wheelhouse and killed all but three of the officers in it. Bell survived with minor injuries and he ordered that the remaining turrets should continue firing on the enemy. As damage control parties battled fires and flooding, Bell used a compass from one of the lifeboats, and commanded the ship by means of commands passed along a chain of men to the lower steering compartment where a team of men struggled with a wheel that was directly connected to the rudder. After all Exeter's guns had been put out of action but still seaworthy, Bell planned to collide with the enemy, saying "I'm going to ram the --------. It will be the end of us but it will sink him too". However the Admiral Graf Spee turned to confront the other two cruisers and Bell was ordered to withdraw for repairs at the Falkland Islands.

The captain, eight officers and 79 members of the crew were given the Freedom of the City of Exeter on 29 February 1940, and were welcomed by a crowd of 50,000 cheering residents. The crew marched through the streets with fixed bayonets, carrying HMS Exeter's shell-torn White Ensign through the streets.

Bell also commanded  in 1945. He retired from the Navy owing to ill health on 8 January 1948.

In the 1956 film The Battle of the River Plate, Bell was played by John Gregson. During the film, Bell's nickname of 'Hookie', because of his distinctive nose, is used.

Bell is listed as a "Naval advisor" in the opening credits of the movie.

References

 .

1973 deaths
1897 births
Royal Navy officers
Royal Navy officers of World War II
Companions of the Order of the Bath
People from Westminster
Royal Navy officers of World War I